Nélson Manuel Marques de Sousa (born 15 March 1984) is a retired Portuguese football player. He also holds French citizenship.

Club career
He made his Primeira Liga debut for União de Leiria on 17 April 2004 as a starter in a 0–0 draw against Estrela da Amadora.

References

1984 births
Footballers from Paris
Living people
Portuguese footballers
U.D. Leiria players
Primeira Liga players
A.D. Ovarense players
Liga Portugal 2 players
G.D. Estoril Praia players
G.D. Chaves players
C.D. Fátima players
Association football defenders